Coaster (stylized as COASTER)  is a commuter rail service in the central and northern coastal regions of San Diego County, California, United States operated by the North County Transit District (NCTD). The  commuter rail line features eight stops, with a travel time of about an hour and five minutes end-to-end. The service operates primarily during weekday peak periods, with limited midday, weekend and holiday service. The Coaster first entered service on February 27, 1995, and has since grown in ridership and capacity.

History 
The North San Diego County Transit Development Board was created in 1975 to consolidate and improve transit in northern San Diego County. Planning began for a San Diego–Oceanside commuter rail line, then called Coast Express Rail, in 1982. Funding for right-of-way acquisition and construction costs came from TransNet, a 1987 measure that imposed a 0.5% sales tax on San Diego County residents for transportation projects. The Board established the San Diego Northern Railway Corporation (SDNR) – a nonprofit operating subsidiary – in 1994.

Coaster service began on February 27, 1995. NCTD originally contracted Amtrak to provide personnel for Coaster trains. In July 2006, TransitAmerica Services took over the day-to-day operation of the commuter train, based on a five-year, $45 million contract with NCTD. In 2016, Bombardier Transportation replaced TransitAmerica as Coaster's operator. In December 2018, NCTD achieved full implementation of positive train control along the entire Coaster route, making it one of only four railroads in the United States to achieve full implementation of this technology without needing an extension beyond 2018.

Future 

San Diego County voters extended the TransNet sales tax through 2038, which includes funding for rail track upgrades. By the early 2010s, numerous improvements such as added double track and bridge replacements were in various stages of construction and design. As part of the broader North Coast Corridor project, approximately $1 billion is planned to be spent on new segments of double track between San Diego and Orange County.

Limited-use stations at the San Diego Convention Center and the Del Mar Racetrack for use during major events have been planned, and is expected to complete construction of the stations in late 2025. A northward extension to Camp Pendleton was also proposed in 2011.

Service 
More than 20 Coaster trains run on weekdays, with additional service on the weekends. As of April 3, 2017, Coaster also added Friday Night service with trains running until a quarter after midnight. More weekend services operate during summer months and when there are special events, such as home games for the San Diego Padres. In March of 2020, all weekend trains and some weekday trains were suspended due to the coronavirus pandemic; however, weekend service was reinstated on May 29, 2021.

Stations

Fares and ticketing 
The cost of Coaster tickets is based upon the number of zones traveled (see map). Fare collection is based on a proof-of-payment system: tickets must be purchased before boarding and are checked by roving fare inspectors. Monthly passes are available. All tickets and passes include transfer agreements with NCTD BREEZE buses and monthly passes include transfer with the Metropolitan Transit System (MTS) buses and Trolleys. On January 20, 2011, the NCTD implemented a fare reduction, which to increased ridership on the Coaster and so was made permanent in September 2011. , regular one-way fares are as follows:

Within one zone: $5
Within two zones: $5.75
Within three zones: $6.50

With proof of eligibility, senior citizens (ages 60 and over), people with disabilities, and Medicare cardholders receive a 50% discount on the above fares.

Riding the Coaster without a valid ticket may result in a penalty fare of up to $250. Riders cannot purchase tickets on board the train.

Pronto Fare System / Former Compass System 

The Coaster, along with all other NCTD and MTS services, utilizes the new Pronto contactless fare system introduced in September 2021 by INIT Systems and SANDAG; the Pronto system succeeded the first-generation Compass Card system." As a replacement for the original "Compass Card," the Pronto fare system allows for a tap-on, tap-off approach, so riders on the Coaster can tap-on when entering the station platform (using one of the station's validators), and tap-off when arriving at the destination stop, in order to deduct the correct fare. However, unlike other NCTD and MTS services, Pronto users for Coaster are required to purchase Day or Monthly Passes prior to riding due to different electronic ticket requirements. These passes along with general Pronto cards can be physically purchased at Pronto ticket vending machines at NCTD facilities, or in customer service centers; electronic versions can be purchased through the website or through the mobile applications.

The Coaster previously utilized the aforementioned contactless "Compass Card", made possible by Cubic Transportation Systems, Inc. The "Compass Card" allowed passengers from MTS and NCTD to store regional transit passes and cash value on a rewritable RFID card. Customers would have purchased passes and added cash value on the Internet or at any ticket vending machine. Prior to boarding a train, customers tapped their Compass Cards on the ticket validator located on the train platform. The LED display on the validator would then light up with lights resembling that of a stoplight, and the LCD display showed text regarding the passenger's fare account.  The new Pronto system now used expanded upon many of the design concepts previously employed with the Compass Card system.

Ridership 
The Coaster carried about 514,450 passengers during its first year of operation, and ridership rose steadily in the years that followed. In 2019, Coaster ridership was approximately 1.4 million people, with an average number of 4,200 weekday boardings.

Approximately 40% of weekday commuters detrain at Sorrento Valley.

Rolling stock 

In June 2018, the North County Transit District (NCTD) Board approved the purchase of five Siemens SC-44 Charger locomotives to replace their existing five F40PHM-2C locomotives that were remanufactured by Morrison-Knudsen, with $10.5 million of the estimated $53.9 million cost earmarked from statewide gas tax and vehicle registration fees. In June 2019, the NCTD Board approved the purchase of two additional SC-44 locomotives to replace two EMD F59PHI locomotives; they are due for delivery in late 2022. In September 2020, the NCTD Board approved the purchase of two more SC-44 Chargers, for a total of nine; planned for delivery in April 2023, they will be used to expand service. Deliveries of the first five Siemens SC-44 Charger locomotives took place from August–October 2020; they began revenue service on February 8, 2021, the same day Coaster retired their five F40PHM-2C locomotives. Two locomotives were donated; 2103 to the Pacific Southwest Railway Museum, and 2105 to the Southern California Railway Museum.

In January 2020, Bombardier began to overhaul the legacy BiLevel equipment at a minimum rate of four cars per year; all 28 cars are planned to be overhauled and repainted into the new COASTER livery by 2026. The coach overhaul improvements include upgraded door systems, installation of LED light fixtures, seat cushion replacements, installation of electrical charging outlets, and suspension maintenance improvements.

In July 2020, the NCTD Board approved the purchase of eleven new Bombardier BiLevel passenger cars (consisting of eight coaches and three crash-energy management cab-cars) that will be used to add two trainsets to regular service and support SANDAG expansion upon delivery in late 2022. The base order also includes options for 27 additional cars, but such options have not currently been exercised.

In August 2018, NCTD announced that they were seeking public opinions and input on a re-brand of the agency, and ran online polls for the public to vote on a new livery for Coaster equipment. The new livery, chosen by Siemens in late 2019, is being applied to the overhauled coaches and to new equipment.

Yards 
NCTD maintains and utilizes two rail yards for the Coaster. The main maintenance and storage yard, located at Stuart Mesa on Camp Pendleton, just north of the Oceanside Transit Center. This is where trains are serviced, maintained and stored for the night. NCTD also utilizes Tracks 25, 26 and 27 of a yard shared by the San Diego Trolley and the San Diego and Imperial Valley Railroad at 12th and Imperial in Downtown San Diego to store trains during midday hours.

See also 

 Transportation in San Diego County
 Commuter rail in North America
 List of United States commuter rail systems by ridership

References

External links 

Coaster – official NCTD site
511sd.com—New site for sdcommute.com
San Diego Metropolitan Transit System

North County Transit District
Passenger rail transportation in California
California railroads
Commuter rail in the United States
Transportation in San Diego
Public transportation in San Diego County, California
Railway lines opened in 1995
Standard gauge railways in the United States
1995 establishments in California